TV Universal is a Brazilian television channel headquartered in the city of Limeira, state of São Paulo, Brazil. It is a channel belonging to Universal Church of the Kingdom of God (in Portuguese, Igreja Universal do Reino de Deus, IURD)  and transmits church services 24 hours a day via Internet and broadcast TV.

Channels 
Bahia:
 Salvador: Channel 57 (UHF)
Piauí:
 Teresina: Channel 32 (UHF)
São Paulo:
 Campinas: Channel 8 (VHF)
 Limeira: Channel 11 (VHF)

References 

Television networks in Brazil
Universal Church of the Kingdom of God
Mass media in Limeira